Bean bag is a bag containing beans.

Bean bag may also refer to:

 Bean bag chair, a type of chair
 Bean bag round, a type of anti-riot projectile
 "Bean Bag" (instrumental), an instrumental tune by Herb Alpert and the theme song to It's a Knockout
 Bean Bags, an album by Coleman Hawkins and Milt Jackson
 Beanbag (band), a Christian rock music group

See also
Beanball, a colloquial sports term for a ball thrown at an opposing player with the intention of striking him